George Cornelius Smith (July 7, 1937 – June 15, 1987) was a second baseman in Major League Baseball who played from 1963 through 1966 for the Detroit Tigers (1963–1965) and Boston Red Sox (1966). A native of St. Petersburg, Florida, he attended Michigan State University.
 
In a four-season career, Smith was a .205 hitter (130-for-634) with nine home runs and 57 RBI in 217 games, including 64 runs, 27 doubles, six triples and nine stolen bases.

Smith played in the Negro leagues for the Indianapolis Clowns (1952) and the Chicago American Giants (1956–1957). In between, he had a brief trial with the unaffiliated St. Petersburg Saints of the Class D Florida State League in 1955. Then, in 1958, he signed with the Tigers' organization as a free agent. He also played winter ball with the Navegantes del Magallanes club of the Venezuelan League in the 1966–67 season.

In , Smith was hobbled by injuries and was replaced as Boston's second baseman by rookie Mike Andrews. He was sent to the San Francisco Giants' Triple-A Phoenix club and finished his career in the minors in 1968.
 
Smith died in 1987 in his hometown of St. Petersburg, Florida from cancer, at the age of 49.

References

External links

1937 births
1987 deaths
African-American baseball players
Baseball players from St. Petersburg, Florida
Boston Red Sox players
Buffalo Bisons (minor league) players
Chicago American Giants players
Deaths from cancer in Florida
Denver Bears players
Detroit Tigers players
Duluth-Superior Dukes players
Durham Bulls players
Indianapolis Clowns players
Knoxville Smokies players
Major League Baseball second basemen
Michigan State Spartans baseball players
Michigan State University alumni
Navegantes del Magallanes players
American expatriate baseball players in Venezuela
Oklahoma City 89ers players
Phoenix Giants players
St. Petersburg Saints players
Syracuse Chiefs players
20th-century African-American sportspeople